Quinneys is a comedy-drama play by the British writer Horace Annesley Vachell, which was first staged in 1914. It was a major hit on its release and went on to become one of the author's most successful plays. However, despite its popularity in London the play met with a lukewarm reception when it opened in New York City in 1915. It focuses on Joseph Quinney the endearing but stubborn head of a family firm of antiques dealers whose firm views cause problems for his relatives and friends.

The play's success led Vachell to write a series of novels following on the adventures of the family.

Film adaptations
The play was twice turned into silents films. Quinneys (1919) directed by Herbert Brenon and Quinneys (1927) directed by Maurice Elvey. 
In 1948 the BBC produced a 90 minute television adaptation.

References

Bibliography
 Bordman, Gerald. American Theatre: A Chronicle of Comedy and Drama 1914-1930. Oxford University Press, 1996.
 Cohen, Deborah. Household Gods: The British And Their Possessions. Yale University Press, 2006.

External links
Quinneys at IMDb

1914 plays
British plays adapted into films
Plays set in England